Carl Iver Hovland (June 12, 1912 – April 16, 1961) was a psychologist working primarily at Yale University and for the US Army during World War II who studied attitude change and persuasion. He first reported the sleeper effect after studying the effects of the Frank Capra's propaganda film Why We Fight on soldiers in the Army. In later studies on this subject, Hovland collaborated with Irving Janis who would later become famous for his theory of groupthink. Hovland also developed social judgment theory of attitude change. Carl Hovland thought that the ability of someone to resist persuasion by a certain group depended on your degree of belonging to the group.

Biography
Carl Iver Hovland was born in Chicago on June 12, 1912. As a child, he had a deep interest in music. Up until college, when psychology became a major part of his life, he was looking into a musical career. In 1938 he married Gertrude Raddatz.

He was recruited by Samuel Stouffer, a sociologist who was on leave from University of Chicago. Hovland had the responsibility of leading a team of fifteen researchers.

Hovland was involved in a study of the conditions under which people are most likely to change their attitudes in response to persuasive messages. The Yale Group's work was first described in Hovland's book Communication and Persuasion, published in 1953.

His major interests in his last few years of life were with concept-formation, which he approached with computer simulation.

In his lifetime, Hovlan was a member of the American Philosophical Society, the American Academy of Arts and Sciences, and the National Academy of Sciences.

Contributions
Psychological research was Hovland's intellectual joy. Especially in his early career, his investigations covered many topics. His papers in psychological journals included a study of test reliability, a major review of the literature on apparent movement, as well as his four classical papers on conditioned generalization from his doctoral dissertation.

Hovland began to emphasize micro-level analysis of propaganda and its effects. Hovland's army experiments were the beginnings of that micro-level analysis of an individual. Hovland's "core conceptual variable was attitude".

Hovland believed that if he was able to recognize the attitude an individual has towards a trigger, he would be able to predict the behavior and actions of an individual over time. However, there were many studies that argued the contrary and showed that "an attitude toward a person or object does not predict or explain an individual's overt behavior regarding that person or object". This revelation of low correlation did not necessarily render findings useless but instead led to further research on how under certain circumstances it was possible to change a person's behavior via their attitudes.

While Hovland focused on an individual rather than a group level, he began to take into consideration interpersonal communication in the form of persuasion. Specifically, Hovland was responsible for carrying out a series of studies that contributed to the "cumulative understanding of persuasion behavior that has never since been matched or even rivaled".

To test and apply his theorization Hovland worked proposed the SMCR model. The SMCR model consists of four components—source variables, message variables, channel variables, and receiver variables. By manipulating each of these variables, Hovland was able to advance his "message-learning approach to attitude change". There were problems with his particular approach, however, in that by focusing on a single dimension of the SMCR model, Hovland was unable to do more than isolate a factor rather than study the synergy between the different variables.

Death
Hovland died on April 16, 1961. When Hovland learned that he had cancer, he continued to work with his Yale doctoral students and conduct persuasion experiments. Finally, when he could work no more, he left his office in the Psychology Department, went to his home in New Haven, drew a bathtub full of water, and drowned himself.

Notes

1912 births
1961 suicides
20th-century American psychologists
Social psychologists
Suicides by drowning in the United States
Yale Sterling Professors
Suicides in Connecticut
1961 deaths
United States Army personnel of World War II
Members of the American Philosophical Society